Booty Royale: Never Go Down Without a Fight!, known in Japan as , is a Japanese ecchi manga series written and illustrated by Rui Takato. It was serialized in Nihon Bungeisha's Bessatsu Manga Goraku in 2014 before being transferred over to Manga Goraku Special in 2015.

Plot
Misora Haebaru is an 18-year-old karate expert from Okinawa who decides to move to Tokyo in order to realize her dream of becoming a famous singer. When she arrives there, however, she discovers that her handlers have tricked her into joining the adult entertainment industry. As such, Misora is forced to participate in a martial arts tournament where she has to fight 100 opponents. If she loses, she must have sex with them.

Media

Manga
The magazine last print issue was released on July 15, 2020. The magazine went online on August 15 of the same year. Nihon Bungeisha has collected its chapters into individual tankōbon volumes. The first volume was released on November 19, 2014. As of March 28, 2022, fourteen volumes have been released.

In July 2022, Takato wrote on his Twitter account that he was retiring from drawing manga, although the statement was unclear whether his retirement will be permanent or temporary, as he alternated between wording that implies both, and that Booty Royale would enter on hiatus. Takato elaborated that due to circumstances at his home, it was difficult to constantly draw manga about "boobs and sex." Takato stated that if the situation in his household changes, he might consider continuing the manga. He added that he is satisfied with his work on the manga as a hybrid "softcore porno" and "battle" manga, and that the series has constantly sold well. He also noted, however, that his motivation for continuing the manga was not high given the circumstances surrounding its production.

The manga is licensed in North America by Seven Seas Entertainment under their Ghost Ship mature imprint in two-in-one omnibus edition.

A spin-off series, titled , was serialized on the online platform Goraku Egg in 2015. Its chapters were collected in a single volume released on February 19, 2016.

Volume list

Live-action film
A live-action film adaptation, directed by Tsuyoshi Shōji at Sedic Deux and starring  as Misora, premiered in Japan on September 12, 2020.

References

Further reading

External links
 

Comedy anime and manga
Ecchi anime and manga
Japanese comedy films
Manga adapted into films
Martial arts anime and manga
Nihon Bungeisha manga
Seinen manga
Seven Seas Entertainment titles